The Continental Congress was initially a convention of delegates from several British American colonies at the height of the American Revolution era, who spoke and acted collectively for the people of the Thirteen Colonies that ultimately became the United States of America. The term mostly refers to the First Continental Congress of 1774 and the Second Continental Congress of 1775–1781. More broadly, it also refers to the Congress of the Confederation of 1781–1789, thus covering the entire period the Continental Congress served as the chief legislative and executive body of the U.S. government.

The unicameral Congress of the Confederation, officially styled "The United States in Congress Assembled," was composed of delegates elected by the legislature of the various states. The Confederation Congress was the immediate successor to the Second Continental Congress; and delegates to it were similarly chosen. Many of the delegates to the initial 1775 session of the Second Continental Congress had also attended the previous First Continental Congress. Altogether, The Biographical Directory of the United States Congress lists 343 men who served as delegates to the Continental Congress in three incarnations from 1774 to 1789; also listed are another 90 persons who were elected as delegates but never served.

Background 
Convened in response to the Intolerable Acts passed by the British Parliament earlier that year, the 56 delegates to the First Continental Congress sought to help repair the frayed relationship between the British government and its American colonies. They passed the Continental Association, an economic boycott of Great Britain, and petitioned the king for a redress of grievances. They also resolved to reconvene in May 1775 if necessary.

Delegates from the various colonies did indeed reconvene for a Second Continental Congress as scheduled, but by the time they gathered, the Revolutionary War had begun. Moderates in the Congress still hoped that the colonies could be reconciled with Great Britain, but a movement towards independence steadily gained ground. At this juncture Congress simultaneously sent an Olive Branch Petition to King George III, hoping for a rapprochement, and issued a Declaration of the Causes and Necessity of Taking Up Arms, which contained the words "Our cause is just. Our union is perfect... being with one mind resolved to die freemen rather than to live slaves...".

Congress functioned as a de facto national government from the outset by establishing the Continental Army, directing strategy, and appointing diplomats. It eventually adopted the Lee Resolution which established the new country on July 2, 1776, and it agreed to the Declaration of Independence two days later.

Afterward, the Congress functioned as the provisional government of the United States through March 1, 1781. During this period, in addition to successfully managing the war effort, its primary achievements included: drafting the Articles of Confederation, the first U.S. Constitution; securing diplomatic recognition and support from foreign nations; and resolving state land claims west of the Appalachian Mountains. When the Articles of Confederation came into force on March 1, 1781, after being ratified by all 13 states, the Continental Congress became the Congress of the Confederation, which helped guide the new nation through the final stages of the Revolutionary War. Under the Articles, the Confederation Congress had limited power. It could declare war, sign treaties, and settle disputes between the states. It could also borrow or print money, but did not have the power to tax; nor could it compel the individual states to comply with its decisions. It convened in eight sessions (a ninth failed to achieve a quorum) prior to being supplanted in 1789, when the United States Congress became the nation's legislative branch of government under a new Constitution.

Article V of the Articles of Confederation 
Article V of the Articles of Confederation for the annual election of delegates to Congress by legislatures of the various states to terms that commenced on the first Monday in November, in every year. Each state could send 2–7 delegates, and no person was permitted to serve as a delegate for more than three years within a span of six years. State legislatures also had the authority to recall or to replace its delegates at any time. Prior to 1781, delegates to the Continental Congress served at the pleasure of the state legislature that commissioned them; neither term limits nor specific start–end–date of service existed.

Elected delegates who participated 

The following tables list the 343 people who served in Congress: 1st Continental, 2nd Continental, or Confederation, between 1774 and 1789, as well as the year(s) of their active participation.

Connecticut

Delaware

Georgia

Maryland

Massachusetts

New Hampshire

New Jersey

New York

North Carolina

Pennsylvania

Rhode Island

South Carolina

Virginia

Elected delegates who did not participate 
The following table lists the 90 people who were elected to Congress: 1st Continental, 2nd Continental, or Confederation, between 1774 and 1789, but who did not participate, as well as the year(s) of their election.

See also 
 Founding Fathers of the United States, includes a listing of which Founding Fathers signed one or more of the era's formative state documents
 Journals of the Continental Congress
 Charles Thomson, secretary of the Continental Congress
 History of the United States (1776–1789)
 Perpetual Union

Notes

References

Further reading 
 
 Garraty, John A.; Carnes, Mark C., gen. eds. (1999, 2002 supplement). American National Biography. 24 volumes. New York, New York: Oxford University Press (for the American Council of Learned Societies). . Official website .
 
 

Continental Congress
Continental Congress
18th century-related lists